In the 1916 season of the Campeonato Paulista, two championships were disputed, each by a different league.

APSA Championship 

Before the start of the championship, Scottish Wanderers was expelled from the league after it became known that the club players who studied at Mackenzie College shared the club's income, which was understood by the APSA as professionalism, which was forbidden by the league. The team was replaced by new entrants Palestra Itália and Santos. At the end of the championship, Paulistano won the title for the 4th time. the top scorer was Paulistano's Mariano with 8 goals.

System
The championship was disputed in a double-round robin system, with the team with the most points winning the title.

Championship

LPF Championship

Corinthians returned to the LPF that year, after a disastrous passage through APSA, which imposed a number of restrictions on it, among them, forbidding it from disputing the championship, forcing it to loan some of its players to teams that were disputing the championship, and allowing it to play friendlies only against fellow APSA members (friendlies that were often purposefully delayed or cancelled). The situation threw the club into a financial crisis, and the team resorted to playing friendlies in nearby cities, such as Campinas and Jundiaí to raise funds. The edition of the 1916 Campeonato Paulista organized by the LPF (Liga Paulista de Football) would be the biggest to date, with fourteen teams. However, the championship was fraught with disorganization, and by December, the league had folded with many matches yet to be played. Corinthians, unbeaten at the time of the league's folding, were declared champions, winning the title for the 2nd time. the top scorer was Corinthians's Aparício with 7 goals.

System
The championship was disputed in a single-round robin system, with the team with the most points winning the title.

Championship

Preliminary

Corinthians qualifies for the Campeonato Paulista

League

References

Campeonato Paulista seasons
Paulista